Manipay Hindu College ( Māṉippāy Intu Kallūri,  Manipayi Hindu Vidyalaya) is a provincial school in Manipay, Sri Lanka. The college was founded by A. V. Sangarapillai, father of Senator Sir Sangarapillai Pararajasingam.

See also
 :Category:People associated with Manipay Hindu College
 List of schools in Northern Province, Sri Lanka

References

External links
 Manipay Hindu College
 Old Students' Association, Canada
 Old Students' Association, UK

1910 establishments in Ceylon
Educational institutions established in 1910
Provincial schools in Sri Lanka
Schools in Manipay